Douglas "Doug" Herring Jr. (born September 29, 1987) is an American-born naturalised Syrian professional basketball player for Gezira. He played college basketball for Utica College.

Collegiate career 
Herring attended Utica College, where he competed at the NCAA Division III level with the Pioneers for four seasons. On December 12, 2005, he was named Empire 8 (E8) Rookie of the Week, after averaging 13.7 points, 4.7 assists, and 3.0 rebounds and helping his team win three consecutive games. As a junior, he was a nominee for the Bob Cousy Award. In his senior year, Herring led the Pioneers to the semifinals of the E8 tournament and garnered all-league honors. Herring completed his career with Utica as its all-time assists leader, with 451, and second-best scorer, with 1,587 points.

Professional career 
Following college, Herring signed with the Hudson Valley Kingz of the Atlantic Coast Professional Basketball League (ACPBL). In his career with the Kingz, he averaged 31.0 points per game. He set a single-game league record with a career-high 66 points against the Manhattan Pride on February 10, 2013. In turn, he was named Player of the Month. On March 2, 2013, Herring broke another league record by putting up 20 assists vs the North Jersey Pros. In the summer of 2013, he notched 53 points at the prestigious Greater Hartford Pro–am. His performance drew the attention of Ian McCarthy, general manager of the Saint John Mill Rats of the National Basketball League of Canada (NBL).

On August 20, 2013, Herring signed a professional contract with the Mill Rats. McCarthy said, "Doug is an undiscovered talent who has the rare combination of being a devastating scorer but he also makes the right basketball plays." Through 42 games, Herring averaged 17.6 points, 5.1 rebounds, 5.2 assists, and 1.7 steals and shot .426 from the three-point line. He was named an NBL Canada All-Star for the Atlantic Division. Following the season, Herring signed with the Rochester Razorsharks of the Premier Basketball League (PBL), playing four games and averaging 9.8 points, 1.8 rebounds, 2.8 assists, and lifting them to the 2014 PBL championship.

On July 24, 2014, Herring signed with the Bristol Flyers of the British Basketball League (BBL). He was expected by head coach Andreas Kapoulas to be an asset to the team's back court. On October 14, he was named to the BBL Team of the Week after scoring 26 points. In 11 games, he averaged 17.7 points, 4.0 rebounds, 4.1 assists, and 1.8 steals. The Flyers made it to the semifinals of the BBL Cup. However, he suffered a season-ending injury with a meniscal tear.

On October 19, 2015, Herring returned to the Mill Rats. Head coach Rob Spon commented, "Doug is an excellent two-way player in this league with great size for a guard."

On December 2, 2016, Herring signed with Defensor Sporting of the Liga Uruguaya de Basketball (LUB), the top league in Uruguay. He said, "I am very thankful and appreciative of Defensor Sporting for the opportunity to join the club."

On January 20, 2017, Herring returned to the NBL Canada with the London Lightning. Prior to the season, the Lightning had acquired rights to Herring from the Windsor Express in exchange for Warren Ward. The signing came after Garrett Williamson suffered a hamstring injury, putting him on the injury reserve. Herring was named to the Third Team All-NBLC.

On January 4, 2019, it was announced that Herring will be joining the CLS Knights of the ABL replacing Montay Brandon as CLS starting Guard 

In September 2021, Herring Jr. signed with Gezira of the Egyptian Basketball Super League.

National team career
In 2021, Herring became a naturalised Syrian citizen. He later made his debut for the Syria national basketball team in the qualifiers for the 2021 FIBA Asia Cup.

References

External links 
Doug Herring, Jr. at Eurobasket.com

1987 births
Living people
American expatriate basketball people in Canada
American expatriate basketball people in China
American expatriate basketball people in France
American expatriate basketball people in Indonesia
American expatriate basketball people in the United Kingdom
American expatriate basketball people in Uruguay
American men's basketball players
Syrian men's basketball players
ASEAN Basketball League players
Basketball players from New York (state)
Guards (basketball)
London Lightning players
Moncton Magic players
Saint John Mill Rats players
Sportspeople from Poughkeepsie, New York
Utica Pioneers men's basketball players
Bristol Flyers players
American expatriate basketball people in Egypt
People with acquired Syrian citizenship
Syrian expatriate basketball people in Egypt
American expatriate basketball people in Macau
American expatriate sportspeople in England